Chasmatonotus is a genus of midges in the family Chironomidae. There are about 14 described species in Chasmatonotus.

Species
These 14 species belong to the genus Chasmatonotus:

References

Further reading

External links

 
 

Chironomidae
Articles created by Qbugbot